Cinemax, also known as Cinemax India Ltd, is an Indian cinema chain.  it owned 138 screens across 39 properties in India, including Ahmedabad, Bangalore, Hyderabad, Kochi, Mumbai, Pune, Kolkata, Kanpur, Bhopal and Nashik. It was previously owned by the Kanakia group but later bought by Cine Hospitality Private Ltd, a subsidiary of PVR Cinemas.

Screens

See also
PVR Cinemas
Big Cinemas
SPI Cinemas
Prasads IMAX
Nandan (Kolkata)

References

External links
Official Site

Companies based in Gurgaon
Cinema chains in India
Entertainment companies established in 2002
2002 establishments in Haryana
Indian companies established in 2002
Companies listed on the National Stock Exchange of India
Companies listed on the Bombay Stock Exchange